is a Japanese voice actress and singer. She is attached to Ken Production.  She is best known for her roles in Idol Tenshi Yokoso Yoko (as Yoko Tanaka), Tanoshii Moomin Ikka (as the Snork Maiden), Goldfish Warning! (as Wapiko), Soreike! Anpanman (as Melonpanna), Yadamon (as Yadamon), After War Gundam X (as Tiffa Adill), Hare Tokidoki Buta (as Harebuta), Galaxy Angel (as Vanilla H and Normad), Higurashi When They Cry (as Satoko Hōjō), Tales of Phantasia (as Arche Klein), Uchi no 3 Shimai (as Sū), Sailor Moon S (as Mimet), Mysterious Theft Saint Tail (as Maju Sendo). She is currently the voice of Jigglypuff in the Pokémon and Super Smash Bros. series. She freelanced for the voice of Bonnie, also from the Pokémon series when her regular voice actress Mariya Ise was on maternity leave.

She married Koichi Yamadera from 1993 to 2006, though their divorce was not disclosed until 2007. They had worked together on the long-running Anpanman series. Her parents worked at the Seinenza Theater Company.

Filmography

Anime

Film

Video games

Drama CD

Live-action

Dubbing roles

Albums
おもちゃ箱 (Omochabako/Toy Box) - 1992
ダイアリ (Diary) - 1993
ナチュレル (Naturelle) - 1994
スタイル (Style) - 1995
ジューク・ボックス (Juke Box) - 1996
クラムチャウダー (Clam Chowder) - 1997
MIKA KANAI "Best Selection" - 1998

Awards

References

External links 
 Official agency profile 
  
 
 
 

Kanai Mika
Japanese video game actresses
Japanese voice actresses
Living people
Voice actresses from Tokyo
Singers from Tokyo
20th-century Japanese actresses
20th-century Japanese women singers
20th-century Japanese singers
21st-century Japanese actresses
21st-century Japanese women singers
21st-century Japanese singers
Ken Production voice actors